Borinquen is a barrio in the municipality of Caguas, Puerto Rico. Its population in 2010 was 7,953.

History 
Puerto Rico was ceded by Spain in the aftermath of the Spanish–American War under the terms of the Treaty of Paris of 1898 and became an unincorporated territory of the United States. In 1899, the United States Department of War conducted a census of Puerto Rico finding that the combined population of Borinquen barrio and Bairoa barrio was 3,870. In 1952, it became a U.S. Commonwealth.

Landmarks and places of interest 

 Caguas Real Golf and Country Club, partially located in Borinquen.
Charco El Cantil, natural swimming pool on the Turabo River.
 Plaza Turabo, a riverside park located along the Turabo River.
 Terrazas de Borinquen Recreational Area, community pool and park.

Gallery

See also

 List of communities in Puerto Rico

References

Barrios of Caguas, Puerto Rico